Darzikola-ye Akhund-e Baba (also Romanized as Darzīkolā-ye Ākhūnd-e Bābā; also known as Darzīkolā-ye Ākhūndī) is a village in Gatab-e Shomali Rural District, Gatab District, Babol County, Mazandaran Province, Iran. At the 2006 census, its population was 340, in 82 families.

References 

Populated places in Babol County